Berc is a small village in the south of France.

In 1968 there were 144 inhabitants.

An independent commune until 1 January 1973, Berc now forms the new commune of Les Monts-Verts with the villages of Arcomie and Le Bacon.

History 
Berc was created in 1877 from the communes of Arcomie, La Fage-Saint-Julien and Termes. On 1 January 1973, it merged with two communes, Arcomie and Le Bacon, to form the new commune named Les Monts-Verts. It then took the status of associated commune which it retained until 17 July 1990 when the simple merger was replaced by the merger-association (prefectural decree of 17 July 1990).

The town was known at the beginning of the twentieth century for its artisanal production of sabots.

Politics and administration

List of mayors from 1877 to 31 December 1972

List of deputy mayors from 1 January 1973 to 17 July 1990

Local culture and heritage

Places and monuments 
 Église Sainte-Marie de Berc.
 Cross near the church of Sainte-Marie.

Personalities 
 Pierre Veyron (1903-1970), Grand Prix motor racing driver, was born in Berc. Bugatti Automobiles named one of its models, the Bugatti Veyron, after him.

See also 
 Les Monts-Verts

References 

Former communes of Lozère
Villages in Occitania (administrative region)